Forbidden Cargo is a 1954 British crime film directed by Harold French and starring Nigel Patrick, Elizabeth Sellars and Jack Warner. It was shot at Pinewood Studios with sets designed by the art director John Howell. Location shooting took place in London and Cannes.

Plot
A customs officer captures a gang of drugs smugglers, assisted by a birdwatcher.

Cast 

 Nigel Patrick as Inspector Michael Kenyon  
 Elizabeth Sellars as Rita Compton  
 Terence Morgan as Roger Compton  
 Greta Gynt as Madame Simonetta  
 Jack Warner as Major Alec White 
 Theodore Bikel as Max  
 Joyce Grenfell as Lady Flavia Queensway  
 James Gilbert as Agent Larkins  
 Eric Pohlmann as Steven Lasovich  
 Martin Boddey as Sub-Director Holt
 Michael Hordern as Director of Customs
 Jacques B. Brunius as Det. Pierre Valance	
 Ronald Adam as Mr. Bennett
 Ballard Berkeley as Cooper 
 Campbell Gray as 	Luigi 
 Campbell Singer as 	Sergeant Dodson, River Police
 Hal Osmond as 	Baggage Room Clerk
 Philip Stainton as Seaburyness Police Sergeant 
 Brian Wilde as Seaburyness Smuggler 
 Campbell Singer as River Police Sergeant
 Tom Gill as Hotel Receptionist
 Jill Adams as Michael's Dance Partner
 Roger Maxwell as	Bird Sanctuary Spokesman 
 Nicholas Phipps as Royal Navy Information Officer
Denis Shaw as Ship's Cook 
 Lloyd Lamble as 	Captain of Python 
 Cyril Chamberlain as 	Customs Officer 
 John Arnatt as Customs Officer
 John Horsley as 	Customs Officer 
 Arnold Diamond as French Customs Officer

Critical reception
Leonard Maltin noted a "Modest drama," which was "enlivened by a solid cast"; British Pictures noted a "Nice cast, but dreary story"; Allmovie wrote, "Apart from the always delightful Joyce Grenfell, Forbidden Cargo is humorless Dragnet material transplanted to the high seas"; while Sky Cinema noted a "workmanlike British thriller from the Fifties, directed by Harold French, has a documentary feel, with some crisp dialogue by Sydney Box. The suave Nigel Patrick stars as the customs investigator alerted to nefarious coastal activities by none other than the wonderful Joyce Grenfell. She is cast as an aristocratic birdwatcher who is most put out that a suspicious landing craft should disturb her nesting birds. Other stalwarts appearing include Elizabeth Sellars and Terence Morgan as brother-and-sister smugglers, Jack Warner, Greta Gynt, Michael Hordern and Eric Pohlmann, particularly good as a Polish racketeer. A pleasing period piece."

References

External links
 
 
Review of film at Variety

1954 films
British black-and-white films
Films shot at Pinewood Studios
Films directed by Harold French
British crime films
1954 crime films
Films set in London
Films shot in London
Films set in France
Films shot in France
Seafaring films
1950s English-language films
1950s British films